Baron Michelham (verbally Lord) , of Hellingly in the County of Sussex, was a title in the Peerage of the United Kingdom. It was created on 28 December 1905 for the banker, businessman and philanthropist Sir Herbert Stern, 1st Baronet. He was head of the firm Herbert Stern & Co. Stern had already been created a Baronet, of Strawberry Hill in the Parish of Twickenham and County of Middlesex, in the Baronetage of the United Kingdom on 31 July 1905. Apart from his British titles he was also a Baron in the Portuguese nobility, a title inherited from his father Baron Hermann de Stern. Lord Michelham was succeeded by his eldest son, the second Baron. His younger brother died before him and on his death in 1984 the titles became extinct.

The first Baron was the first cousin of Sydney Stern, 1st Baron Wandsworth, and Sir Edward Stern, 1st Baronet, of Fan Court, Chertsey (now Longcross/Lyne).

Barons Michelham (1905)
Herbert Stern, 1st Baron Michelham (1851–1919)
Herman Alfred Stern, 2nd Baron Michelham (1900–1984)

References

Debrett's Peerage and Baronetage (1968 edition)

See also
Stern Baronets

Extinct baronies in the Peerage of the United Kingdom
Noble titles created in 1905
1905 establishments in the United Kingdom
Stern family (banking)
People from Hellingly